Chlorogalum angustifolium is a species of flowering plant, known by the common name narrowleaf soap plant.

Distribution
It is native to the Sierra Nevada foothills and inner North Coast Ranges of California, and the mountains of southern Oregon, where it grows in heavy, rocky soils in woodland and on grassy hillsides.

Description
Chlorogalum angustifolium is a perennial wildflower growing from a fibrous bulb a few centimeters wide. It has narrow basal leaves only a few millimeters wide.

The inflorescence may be up to 70 centimeters long and is composed of several ephemeral flowers which open in the evening and close by the following morning. Each has six tepals about a centimeter long which are white with yellow-green midveins. There are six stamens tipped with large yellow anthers.

The fruit is a capsule 1 to 3 millimeters long.

Uses
The indigenous Karuk people of northern California used the soapy juice from the crushed bulbs of this plant as a detergent for washing clothing.

References

External links
Calflora Database: Chlorogalum angustifolium (narrowleaf soap plant, narrow leaved soaproot)
Jepson Manual eFlora (TJM2) treatment of Chlorogalum angustifolium
USDA Plants Profile for Chlorogalum angustifolium
Flora of North America
UC Photos gallery — Chlorogalum angustifolium

angustifolium
Flora of California
Flora of Oregon
Flora of the Sierra Nevada (United States)
Natural history of the California chaparral and woodlands
Natural history of the California Coast Ranges
Natural history of the Central Valley (California)
Flora without expected TNC conservation status